Hinton-in-the-Hedges is a small village and civil parish in West Northamptonshire, England,  due west of the town of Brackley. West of the village is Hinton-in-the-Hedges Airfield. At the time of the 2001 census, the parish's population was 179 people. It had decreased to 167 at the 2011 Census.

History
The village's name means "community farm/settlement". There is no known record of monastic settlement here.

The parish church is dedicated to The Most Holy Trinity. A church has existed here since Saxon times the earliest recorded Rector being Sir Richard de Hynton in 1275. There are monuments to Sir William Hinton (d.13th century), Raynold Braye (d.1582) and Salathiell Crewe (d.1686).

The Old Rectory in the village is dated 1678 and there are a number of other building which are listed.

The Imperial Gazetteer of England and Wales described the parish in the 1870s as follows:

References

External links

Official Village website: http://hinton-in-the-hedges.org

Villages in Northamptonshire
West Northamptonshire District
Civil parishes in Northamptonshire